In human anatomy, the hilum (plural hila), sometimes formerly called a hilus (plural hili), is a depression or fissure where structures such as blood vessels and nerves enter an organ. Examples include:
 Hilum of kidney, admits the renal artery, vein, ureter, and nerves
 Splenic hilum, on the surface of the spleen, admits the splenic artery, vein, lymph vessels, and nerves
 Hilum of lung, a triangular depression where the structures which form the root of the lung enter and leave the viscus
 Hilum of lymph node, the portion of a lymph node where the efferent vessels exit
 Hilus of dentate gyrus, part of hippocampus that contains the mossy cells.

Anatomy